Raub Lake Park is a lake park in Raub District  in Pahang, Malaysia. People can relax around the lake area and also rent boats to go sightseeing around the lake.

References

Landforms of Pahang
Raub District
Parks in Malaysia
Tourist attractions in Pahang